Jonathan Garrido (born 27 November 1973) is a Spanish cyclist. He competed in the team pursuit at the 1992 Summer Olympics.

References

External links
 

1973 births
Living people
Spanish male cyclists
Olympic cyclists of Spain
Cyclists at the 1992 Summer Olympics
Cyclists from Barcelona